Aughey is a townland of 109 acres in County Fermanagh, Northern Ireland. It is situated in the civil parish of Derryvullan and the historic barony of Tirkennedy.

See also
List of townlands in County Fermanagh

References

Townlands of County Fermanagh
Civil parish of Derryvullan